The 2003 Polish Figure Skating Championships were held in Sosnowiec between December 13 and 15, 2002.

Senior results

Men

Ladies

Pairs

Ice dancing

Junior results

Men

Ladies

Pairs

Ice dancing

Synchronized

Novice results

Men

Ladies

Pairs

Ice dancing

External links
 2003 Polish Championships results at the Polish Figure Skating Association
 2003 Polish Championships results
 Junior ladies results
 Junior dance results
 Novice ladies results
 Novice pairs results
 Novice dance results

Polish Figure Skating Championships
2002 in figure skating
2002 in Polish sport